BD1063 or 1-[2-(3,4-dichlorophenyl)ethyl]-4-methylpiperazine is a selective sigma receptor antagonist, with a reported binding affinity of Ki = 9 ± 1 nM for the sigma-1 receptor and more than 49 times selectivity over the sigma-2 receptor.

Consistent with other reported sigma receptor antagonists, pretreating Swiss Webster mice with BD1063 significantly decreases the convulsivity and lethality of cocaine.

In other animal studies, BD1063 blocks the effects of MDMA, and reduces alcohol intake in rodent models of alcoholism.

See also

 BD1008
 BD1031
 LR132

References

Chloroarenes
Piperazines